Rocket Scientists is a progressive rock band formed in the late 1980s by keyboardist Erik Norlander and vocalist / guitarist Mark McCrite. The band released their first CD, Earthbound, in 1993 joined by session bassist Don Schiff. Schiff quickly became a part of the band for their second release in 1995, Brutal Architecture, and the three toured in the US and Europe in 1997 along with drummer Tommy Amato culminating in the live CD, Earth Below and Sky Above: Live in Europe and America. In 1999, Rocket Scientists released Oblivion Days.

Members

Current lineup
 Mark McCrite -  Vocals, Guitar
 Erik Norlander - Keyboards
 Don Schiff - Bass, NS/Stick

Discography

Studio albums
 Earthbound (1993)
 Brutal Architecture (1995)
 Oblivion Days (1999)
 Revolution Road (2006)
 Supernatural Highways (Instrumental EP, 2014)
 Refuel (2014)

Live albums and compilations
 Earth Below and Sky Above: Live in Europe and America (1998)
 Looking Backward (2007)

External links
 Rocket Scientists official site
 Rocket Scientists YouTube channel
 Rocket Scientists MySpace page

Musical groups from Los Angeles
Progressive rock musical groups from California